The Pentax smc DA 16-45mm F4 ED AL is a standard zoom lens for Pentax K-mount, announced by Pentax on December 9, 2003. It has a constant maximum aperture of f/4.

References
www.dpreview.com

External links

16-45
Camera lenses introduced in 2003